Johannetta of Sayn-Wittgenstein may refer to:

Johannetta of Sayn-Wittgenstein (1561–1622)
Johannetta of Sayn-Wittgenstein (1632–1701)